Callide may refer to:

 Callide, Queensland, a locality in the Shire of Banana, Queensland, Australia
 Electoral district of Callide, an electorate for the Queensland Legislative Assembly, Australia